Justin Roderick Strunk Jr. (June 11, 1936 – October 5, 1981) was an American singer-songwriter and comedian.

Biography

Early years
Born in Jamestown, New York, United States, he was raised in Buffalo, New York, where as a small boy his showmanship became evident. After he learned to play the banjo, Strunk began entertaining locals and went on to wide recognition after appearances on national television network shows such as Rowan & Martin's Laugh-In and The Tonight Show Starring Johnny Carson.

Academic
He graduated from the Virginia Military Institute in 1959 with a B.A in History.

"Daisy A Day"

Although much of Strunk's material was humorous, his most popular song was not. "Daisy a Day", which Strunk wrote and recorded in 1973, is a gentle, sentimental ballad in 3/4 time, describing the relationship between a boy and girl who ultimately grow old together. For every day of their lives, he gives her a daisy as a sign of their love. In the last verse, she has died, but her widower husband continues to make daily visits to her grave. The song made the Billboard Top 20 on both the country and pop music charts. A cover version, Een Roosje, M'n Roosje (A Rose, My Rose) by Conny Vandenbos, reached No. 7 on the Dutch Top 40 hit list in 1974.

Laugh-In
Strunk was a regular member of the Laugh-In cast during its last season in 1972 and 1973.— During the Laugh-In Looks at the News segment, he often reported fictitious sporting events "directly from Farmington, Maine, spahts capitol of the wahld".

Other material
Strunk also wrote three humorous songs that made it into the country music charts, and he toured with the Andy Williams Road Show. One of these songs, "The Biggest Parakeets in Town," was a tongue-in-cheek story of a woman who is a bird fancier. Its central joke is the unspoken pun of "parakeets/pair o'tits" used in the title. Other singles, such as "Next Door Neighbor's Kid" and the patriotic "My Country," appeared on various Billboard surveys. Strunk also scored a songwriting hit with "Bill Jones' General Store", the title track of his 1971 album of a similar name; Canadian musician Tommy Hunter charted in the top 20 on the country and adult contemporary charts in Canada with the song.

Last years and death
Strunk became a folk hero in Maine and in 1970 narrowly lost the election for Senate seat in the state legislature. He was also a private pilot and purchased a 1941 Fairchild M62-A. On October 5, 1981, he suffered a heart attack just after take-off in the aircraft at Carrabassett Valley Airport, in Maine. The plane flipped over, falling some 300 feet, killing him instantly along with his passenger, Dick Ayotte, a long-time friend and local businessman.  Strunk was 45 years old.

Legacy
His sons contribute to the Sugarloaf Community, with Jud's grandson performing onstage at The Rack on Friday evenings.

Discography

Albums

Singles

References

External links

1936 births
1981 deaths
American country singer-songwriters
American male singer-songwriters
Singer-songwriters from New York (state)
Aviators killed in aviation accidents or incidents in the United States
People from Franklin County, Maine
People from Jamestown, New York
Musicians from Buffalo, New York
Accidental deaths in Maine
20th-century American singers
Comedians from New York (state)
20th-century American comedians
Country musicians from New York (state)
20th-century American male singers
Victims of aviation accidents or incidents in 1981